Robin Humphrey Milford (22 January 1903 – 29 December 1959) was an English composer and music teacher.

Biography 
Milford was born in Oxford, son of Sir Humphrey Milford, publisher with Oxford University Press.  He attended Rugby School from 1916 where his musical talent for the piano, flute and theory was first recognised by Arthur Peppin, the director of music. From 1921 until 1926 he studied at the Royal College of Music where his composition teachers were Gustav Holst and Ralph Vaughan Williams, and he studied harmony and counterpoint under R. O. Morris. He also studied organ.

In 1927, he married.  Realising that he would not be able to make a living solely as a composer he worked for a time with the Aeolian Company correcting Duo-Art pianola rolls until 1930.  He also taught part-time at Ludgrove School (where his pupils included the music enthusiast George Lascelles, later 7th Earl of Harewood) and at Downe House School.  In 1929 he had met fellow-composer Gerald Finzi, with whom he found he had much in common, personally and musically, and the two formed a lifelong friendship.

His early compositions met with some success, his Double Fugue Op. 10 winning a Carnegie Trust award, being published in the Carnegie Collection of British Music series and performed by the London Symphony Orchestra under Ralph Vaughan Williams.  In September 1931 his oratorio A Prophet in the Land Op. 21 was performed in Gloucester Cathedral as part of the Three Choirs Festival - the work was somewhat overshadowed by the splash made by William Walton's Belshazzar's Feast performed the same year. In 1937 a performance of his Concerto Grosso Op. 46 was directed by Malcolm Sargent, and his Violin Concerto Op. 47 was broadcast by the BBC in early 1938.

At the outbreak of the Second World War Milford volunteered for the army, and was posted to the Pioneer Corps.  After just one week, he suffered a breakdown, and after treatment he and his family moved to Guernsey.  His depression was deepened by the death of his mother in 1940.  He returned to England, to teach and compose, but soon afterwards his five-year-old son, Barnaby, was killed in a road accident. His grief at this tragedy prompted him to attempt suicide; sent back to hospital after this, he tried to kill himself yet again while a patient there. In 1946, he had recovered sufficiently to resume teaching (at Badminton School) and to undertake musical activities.  He continued composing throughout this period.

After the death of his father in 1952, he was prescribed occasional shock therapy.  He did continue to enjoy successes: his Overture for a Celebration Op. 103 was performed under John Barbirolli at the 1955 Cheltenham Music Festival. He also continued to receive moral and material support from his friends, Finzi (who led a performance of Fishing by Moonlight Op 96 in 1956) and Vaughan Williams (who arranged a performance of the Concertino Op 106 in 1958, and gave financial help).

The deaths of Finzi (1956) and Vaughan Williams (1958) affected Milford deeply, aggravating the effects of his physical decline, which involved loss of vision and impaired balance. He died by his own hand, taking an overdose of aspirin in December 1959.

Notable compositions 
A more complete list may be found in Copley (1984).

Orchestral
 Double Fugue Op. 10 (1926)
 Symphony (No 1) (1927)
 The Darkling Thrush Op. 17, violin and orchestra (1929)
 Go Little Book Op. 18, suite for flute, optional soprano and orchestra (1928)
 Two Orchestral Interludes Op. 19e (arrangements of two easy piano duets, written before 1930)
'Mr John Peel Passes By'
'Ben Jonson’s Pleasure'
 Concertino for Harpsichord and String Orchestra Op. 20 (1929)
 Symphony Op. 34 (1933, perhaps never performed in full, withdrawn in 1956 although admired by Vaughan Williams, revived at the English Music Festival, May 2019)
 Miniature Concerto in G Op. 35, for orchestra or string quartet with optional double basses (1933)
 Concerto Grosso Op. 46 (1936)
 Violin Concerto Op. 47 (1937)
 Elegy for James Scott, Duke of Monmouth and Buccleugh Op. 50, for string orchestra (1939)
 Elegiac Meditation Op. 83, for viola and string orchestra (1946–47)
 Fishing by Moonlight Op. 96 for piano and string orchestra (1952 arrangement of 1949 piece for two harpsichords or two pianos)
 Festival Suite Op. 97, for string orchestra (1950)
 Overture for a Celebration Op. 103 (1952–54)
 Concertino in E Op. 106, for piano and string orchestra (1955)

Dramatic
 The Shoemaker Op. 3, children's opera (1923)
 The Scarlet Letter Op. 112, opera based on novel by Nathaniel Hawthorne (1958–59)

Choral
 A Prophet in the Land Op. 21, dramatic oratorio (1929)
 A Mass for Children's Voices Op. 62 (1941–42)
 A Mass for Christmas Morning Op. 84, for five voices (1945–47)
 Days and Moments (1953), cantata for soprano, chorus and strings, setting Walter de la Mare

Song
 Daybreak (1930), setting John Donne
 Four Songs Op. 36 (1933), setting Robert Bridges
 Cradle Song (1935), setting William Blake
 Four Seasonable Songs (before 1936)
 Four Hardy Songs Op. 48 (1938) includes 'The Colour' and 'If it's ever Spring Again'
 Swan Songs (1940s), nine songs

Chamber and instrumental
 My Lady's Pleasure, suite for piano (before 1925)
 A Chorale Prelude on "St. Columba" Op. 14 (1928) for organ (arranged for orchestra as film music for a television episode of Star Trek)
 Phantasy Quintet for clarinet and string quartet (1933)
 Prelude, Air and Finale (on a well-known mordent) for piano (1935)
 Reputation Square, six hornpipes for piano (1937)
 Idyll: Under the Greenwood Tree, Op. 57, for violin and piano (1941)
 Sonata in C for flute and piano, Op. 69a (1944), of which Milford arranged the slow movement for flute and string orchestra
 Violin Sonata in D Major (1945)
 Six Easter Meditations for organ (1943-46)
 Trio in F major (1948)
 Three Airs, for treble recorder or flute and piano (1958)

References 
 
 Blom, Eric (1942).  Music in England. Penguin Books, London.

External links
 Robin Milford Trust

Notes 

1903 births
1959 suicides
Drug-related suicides in England
English classical composers
Alumni of the Royal College of Music
People from Oxford
English opera composers
Male opera composers
People educated at Rugby School
20th-century classical composers
20th-century English composers
English male classical composers
20th-century British male musicians
1959 deaths
Oratorio composers